Benjamin Stone Roberts (November 18, 1810 – January 29, 1875) was an American lawyer, civil engineer, and a general in the Union Army during the American Civil War.

Early life
Roberts was born in Manchester, Vermont. He graduated from the United States Military Academy in 1835, ranking near the bottom of his class (53rd out of 56). He resigned four years later to pursue a career in civil engineering on railroads in New York and overseas in Russia. After his return from Russia, he settled in Iowa, where he practiced law.

Mexican-American War
In 1846, at the beginning of the Mexican–American War, Roberts was reappointed a first lieutenant, Mounted Rifles, in the Regular Army. He was promoted to captain in 1847, and saw action at Veracruz, Cerro Gordo, Contreras, Churubusco, and the capture of Mexico City, Matamoros and the Galajara pass. At Churubusco, he was brevetted major for leading an advance party of stormers. He received a further brevet, to lieutenant colonel in 1847 for gallantry during the war. After the close of hostilities, he served on the frontier and in Washington, D.C.

Civil War
At the outbreak of the Civil War, Roberts was major of the 3rd U.S. Cavalry. He served in Arizona and New Mexico in 1861 and 1862. He was promoted to brigadier general of Volunteers on June 16, 1862, and assigned to General John Pope's staff as Inspector General and Chief of Cavalry. He saw action at Cedar Mountain, Rappahannock Station, Sulphur Springs and the Second Battle of Bull Run. After Bull Run, he was manipulated by Secretary of War Edwin M. Stanton to prefer charges of disloyalty, disobedience and misconduct against Fitz John Porter, and testified at the subsequent court-martial, which ruined Porter's career.

After the court-martial, Roberts was reassigned to Minnesota, where he chased Indians, until being recalled to Washington in February 1863. He commanded a division in VIII Corps later in 1863, another in XIX Corps in 1864, and then served in the District of West Tennessee in 1865. He was brevetted brigadier general, United States Army, for his actions at Cedar Mountain, and major general, Volunteers, for Second Bull Run.

Later life
Roberts continued to serve in the Regular Army, as lieutenant colonel of the 3rd Cavalry, until 1868, then taught military science at Yale University until his retirement on December 15, 1870. He died in Washington, D.C., and was buried at the Oak Hill Cemetery there. He was later reinterred at Dellwood Cemetery, Manchester, Vermont.

See also

 List of American Civil War generals (Union)
 Vermont in the American Civil War

References
 Boatner, Mark M., The Civil War Dictionary, New York:Vintage Books, 1988, 1991 edition, pp. 701–702.
 Peck, Theodore S., compiler, Revised Roster of Vermont Volunteers and lists of Vermonters Who Served in the Army and Navy of the United States During the War of the Rebellion, 1861–66, Montpelier, VT.: Press of the Watchman Publishing Co., 1892, p. 680.
 Sifakis, Stewart, Who Was Who in the Union, New York: Facts on File, Inc., 1988, pp. 337–338.
 Warner, Ezra J., Generals In Blue: Lives of the Union Commanders, Baton Rouge: Louisiana State University Press, 1964, 1992, pp. 405–406.

External links
 
 
 

1810 births
1875 deaths
People of Vermont in the American Civil War
American military personnel of the Mexican–American War
Union Army generals
United States Military Academy alumni
People from Manchester, Vermont
Burials at Oak Hill Cemetery (Washington, D.C.)